The Rockfort Express is a Superfast Express overnight Express rail connecting Tiruchirappalli with Chennai Egmore via Villupuram in the South Indian state of Tamil Nadu. This train serves as the main connectivity to the state capital Chennai city and Tiruchirappalli city along the route.

Background and Relevance
The eponymous train is named after the famous 12th-century fortress Rockfort temple in the heart of  Tiruchirapalli. The train originally ran between Madras Egmore and Tiruchirappalli Junction on the 'Chord Line'. Later, when the 'Main Line' was closed for operations to facilitate gauge conversion projects, a part of this train was extended to Thanjavur Junction as Rockfort Link Express (6177A/ 6178A). It was further extended to Kumbakonam during the Mahamaham festival. The extended run was truncated effective September 2013. The entire formation now runs up to Tiruchirappalli Junction. Converted as Superfast Express from 08.06.2017 and Renumbered as (12653/12654).

This train originally had a signal-green livery, with a yellow stripe along the upper and lower part of windows. It later was changed to the standard VB Maroon-livery when it was run on the MG. On BG it ran with the Conventional ICF coaches and later it is converted to LHB rake.

Rakes
The Rockfort Superfast Express is one of the very few prestigious trains in the Indian Railways to have coaches of all the six classes of Indian Railway. It was running with 22 LHB coaches including an AC First Class, AC 2-Tier, First class, AC 3-tier, Sleeper Class and General Sitting compartments. It is nicknamed as VIP Train since its inception, because it's one of the few trains in olden days of IR to have AC compartments and that many famous politicians and wealthy people patronise it. It is also nicknamed Sleep-killer train as this train reaches its destination in both directions in early hours of morning, as a result of speeding up of this train due to double electrified chord line. First Class coaches were removed in May 2014, as per railway policy.
New LHB (Linke Hofmann Busch) coaches has been allotted for this train. The train runs with LHB coaches from 26 September 2016, due to this the Composition of the train has been changed to accommodate Generator cars with 22 coaches. Later due to greater demand of Unreserved coaches additional GS was added and now running with 22 same coaches, making it one of few LHB trains to run with 22 coaches. The train usually runs to full capacity.

Coach composition
In total 22 coaches are there. It includes One AC First Class (1A), AC 2 Tier (2A), AC 3 Tier (3A), Sleeper Class (SL), Unreserved general sitting coach (UR) and End on Generators (EOG).

Maintenance
The Primary Maintenance of the coaches are managed at SSE/C&W/MDU, there is no Secondary maintenance required.

See also
 Cholan Express
 Pallavan Express
 Tiruchirappalli – Tirunelveli Intercity Express
 Vaigai Superfast Express
 Pandian Superfast Express
 Vascodagama Express

Notes

References

External links
 

Transport in Chennai
Named passenger trains of India
Rail transport in Tamil Nadu
Railway services introduced in 1972
Rail transport in Tiruchirappalli
Express trains in India